Russell Beiersdorf (born December 24, 1965) is an American professional golfer who played on the Nationwide Tour and the PGA Tour.

Beiersdorf was born in Dallas, Texas. He played collegiately at Southern Methodist University and turned professional in 1986.

Beiersdorf played on the Nationwide Tour in 1990-1992 and 1995–1998 and he played on the PGA Tour in 1993 and 1994. Beiersdorf won three tournaments on the Nationwide Tour. He scored a hole in one on the third hole at the South Course at Torrey Pines in 1994.

Professional wins (3)

Ben Hogan Tour wins (3)

*Note: The 1992 Ben Hogan Greater Greenville Classic was shortened to 36 holes due to rain.

Ben Hogan Tour playoff record (2–0)

See also
1992 Ben Hogan Tour graduates

External links

American male golfers
SMU Mustangs men's golfers
PGA Tour golfers
Korn Ferry Tour graduates
Golfers from Dallas
1965 births
Living people